The Potamkin Prize for Research in Pick's, Alzheimer's, and Related Diseases was established in 1988 and is sponsored by the American Academy of Neurology. The prize is funded through the philanthropy of the Potamkin Foundation. The prize is awarded for achievements on emerging areas of research in Pick's disease, Alzheimer's disease and other dementias. 

The award includes a medallion, $100,000 prize, and a 20-minute lecture at the American Academy of Neurology annual meeting. The prize is named after Luba Potamkin (wife of Victor Potamkin) who, in 1978, was diagnosed with a form of dementia which was identified as Pick's disease, a form of frontotemporal dementia.

A website dedicated to the Potamkin Prize was launched in 2020 and included background on the prize, biographies of past winners, and information about applying or being nominated.

Awards
Source (to 2017): American Academy of Neurology
 2021: Kenneth Kosik, Giovanna Mallucci
 2020: J. Paul Taylor
 2019: Randall J. Bateman 
 2018: David Bennett
 2017: Claudia Kawas, Kristine Yaffe
 2016: Rosa Rademakers, Bryan J. Traynor
 2015: Peter Davies, 
 2014: 
 2012: 
 2010: , 
 2008: , William E. Klunk, and Chester A. Mathis
 2007: 
 2006: Karen Ashe, Karen Duff, and Bradley Hyman
 2005: , and 
 2004: , 
 2003: David M. Holtzman, 
 2002: Christian Haass, Bart De Strooper
 2001: 
 2000: Maria Grazia Spillantini, 
 1998: Michel Goedert, Virginia M.-Y. Lee, John Q. Trojanowski
 1996: Rudolph Tanzi, Peter St. George-Hyslop
 1995: , Khalid Iqbal, 
 1994: , Gerard D. Schellenberg
 1993: , Alison Goate, John Hardy, Christine Van Broeckhoven
 1992: Donald L. Price, 
 1991: Stanley B. Prusiner
 1990: Colin L. Masters, Konrad Beyreuther
 1989: Dennis Selkoe, George G. Glenner
 1988:

See also

 List of medicine awards
 List of neuroscience awards

References

External links
 Potamkin Prize for Research in Pick's, Alzheimer's, and Related Diseases

Potamkin Prize
Neuroscience awards
Awards established in 1988
American science and technology awards